Andrei Ujică  (born 1951 in Timișoara, Romania) is a Romanian screenwriter and director.

Life and work
Ujicǎ studied literature in Timișoara, Bucharest and Heidelberg. He moved to Germany in 1981. In 1990 he began making films. Together with Harun Farocki, he created Videograms of a Revolution, a film which has become a standard work in Europe when referring to relationships between political power and the media and the end of the Cold War, and which was listed by the magazine Cahiers du Cinéma as one of the top 10 subversive films of all time.

His next work, Out of the Present, told the story of the cosmonaut Sergei Krikalyov who spent 10 months on board MIR, while back on Earth, the Soviet Union collapsed. The film has been compared to classics such as 2001: A Space Odyssey and Solaris and is considered one of the non-fiction cult films of the 1990s. His 2005 project, Unknown Quantity, creates a fictional conversation between Paul Virilio and Svetlana Alexievich, author of "Voices from Chernobyl", exploring the witness's protocol and the generation of history into catastrophe.

In 2001, Ujicǎ became a professor for film at the Karlsruhe University of Arts and Design. He founded the ZKM Film Institute in 2002 and is its director.

Filmography 
 1992: Videograms of a Revolution (director)
 1992: Kamera und Wirklichkeit (director and screenwriter)
 1995: Out of the Present (director and screenwriter)
 2000: 2 Pasolini'
 2005: Unknown Quantity 2010: The Autobiography of Nicolae Ceausescu''

References

External links 
 

1951 births
Writers from Timișoara
Romanian film directors
German documentary film directors
Romanian emigrants to West Germany
Living people